Alpha-protein kinase 1 is an enzyme that in humans is encoded by the ALPK1 gene.

Unlike most eukaryotic kinases, alpha kinases, such as LAK, recognize phosphorylation sites in which the surrounding peptides have an alpha-helical conformation.[supplied by OMIM]

References

External links

Further reading